La ripetente fa l'occhietto al preside (The repeating student winked at the principal) is a 1980 Italian commedia sexy all'italiana directed by Mariano Laurenti.

Plot   
Italy, 1980. After some breaks, Angela Pastorelli, daughter of a wealthy industrialist, resumed interrupted studies. Among the classmates there is the handsome Carlo Lucignani whom the girl wants to hang up, but Carlo received from his father, a Pastorelli employee, the ban to date Angela.

Cast 
 Anna Maria Rizzoli: Angela Pastorelli
 Lino Banfi: Principal Rodolfo Calabrone
 Loredana Martinez: Lisetta
 Alvaro Vitali: Professor Beccafico
 Carlo Sposito: Don Evaristo
 Ria De Simone: professoressa Monica Zappa
 Leo Colonna: Carlo
 Walter Valdi: father of Carlo 
 Chris Avram: Pastorelli

See also   
 List of Italian films of 1980

References

External links

1980 films
Commedia sexy all'italiana
1980s sex comedy films
Films directed by Mariano Laurenti
Italian high school films
Films scored by Gianni Ferrio
1980 comedy films
1980s Italian-language films
1980s Italian films